Odón Alonso Ordás (28 February 1925 – 21 February 2011) was a Spanish conductor and composer, best known for his film scores.

Alonso was born at La Bañeza, León, Spain.  He studied in Madrid, Siena, Salzburg and Vienna. His first engagements as a conductor date back to the years between 1952 and 1956 when he was performing with the orchestra and chorus of the Spanish National Radio station. In 1960 he took on the position of principal conductor at the Philharmonic Orchestra of Madrid; between 1968 and 1984, Alonso was musical director of the Radio Symphony Orchestra of the Spanish Broadcasting (Orquesta Sinfónica de Radio Televisión Española). From 1986 until 1994 he conducted the Symphonic Orchestra of Puerto Rico.  He died in Madrid.

See also
Himno a León

External links
Concert review 

1925 births
2011 deaths
People from La Bañeza
Spanish composers
Spanish male composers
Spanish conductors (music)
Male conductors (music)
20th-century Spanish musicians
20th-century conductors (music)
20th-century Spanish male musicians